Andrew Gavin Hastings,  (born 3 January 1962) is a Scottish former rugby union player.  A fullback, he is widely regarded to be one of the best ever Scottish rugby players and was one of the outstanding players of his generation, winning 61 caps for Scotland, 20 of which as captain. He played for Watsonians, London Scottish, Cambridge University, Scotland and the British Lions. He twice toured with the British and Irish Lions, to Australia in 1989 and as captain on the 1993 tour to New Zealand.

Early life
Hastings was born in Edinburgh, and was educated at George Watson's College, Edinburgh, Paisley College of Technology (now the University of the West of Scotland), and Magdalene College, Cambridge, where he read Land Economy and graduated with a BA in 1986.

Rugby union career

Amateur career
Hastings captained the victorious 1985 Cambridge University side, and during his sabbatical year he won the Gallaher Shield with Auckland University. In Scotland, Hastings played for Watsonians.

Provincial and professional career
Hastings played for  Edinburgh District in the era before professionalism, before switching to the club side London Scottish when he then turned out for Scottish Exiles.

When the top sides of rugby union turned professional in 1996, he was still playing for London Scottish.

International career
Hastings captained the first Scottish schoolboys' side to win on English soil.

He had 5 caps for Scotland 'B' between 1983 and 1985.

Hastings made his debut for Scotland against France in 1986 and was a central figure in Scotland's 1990 Five Nations Grand Slam.  In February 1995 he became the holder of a record number of Scottish caps when he made his 53rd full international appearance, passing Colin Deans and Jim Renwick.

Hastings's final game was on 11 June 1995 against New Zealand in Pretoria at the quarter-finals of the 1995 Rugby World Cup. By the end of that match he had scored 667 international points, a Scottish record that stood until surpassed by Chris Paterson in 2008.

Hastings captained Scotland on 20 occasions including at the 1995 World Cup.

Hastings first played for the British and Irish Lions in 1986, against a Rest of the World XV, before playing in all three tests of the successful 1989 tour to Australia and against France in 1989. He was captain on the 1993 tour to New Zealand, where the Lions lost the test series 2-1.

Administrative career
On 30 August 2007 Hastings was announced as the chairman of the "New" Edinburgh professional rugby club.

American Football career
In 1996, Hasting joined the Scottish Claymores an American Football team in the NFL Europe.  He played a single season as a placekicker scoring 24 of 27 conversions but missed his only attempt at a field goal.  Despite the Claymores winning the World Bowl, Hastings was released at the end of the season.

Family
Hastings younger brother Scott was also a Scotland international rugby union player.
His son, Adam plays for Gloucester Rugby and also has represented Scotland. His niece, Kerry-Anne represents Scotland at Hockey.

Hastings wife Diane, whom he married in 1993, was diagnosed with Parkinsons Disease in 2003.

Hastings's nickname is "Big Gav".

Honours and awards
Hastings awarded an Honorary Blue from Heriot Watt University in 1995 for his contribution to sport at a national level.

Hastings was awarded the Order of the British Empire in 1993 for services to rugby union.

Hastings was inducted into the International Rugby Hall of Fame in 2003 and later into the World Rugby Hall of Fame in 2013.

Since its formation in 2001, Hastings has been the Patron of Sandpiper Trust, a Scottish charity which provides life-saving medical equipment to rural doctors, nurses and paramedics across Scotland.

International tries

Scotland

British & Irish Lions

References

External links 
Gavin Hastings on the Sporting Heroes website
Gavin Hastings profile on the ESPN website

1962 births
Living people
Alumni of Magdalene College, Cambridge
University of Auckland alumni
Cambridge University R.U.F.C. players
Rugby union players from Edinburgh
Scottish rugby union players
Rugby union fullbacks
British & Irish Lions rugby union players from Scotland
Barbarian F.C. players
London Scottish F.C. players
Watsonians RFC players
Scottish players of American football
Officers of the Order of the British Empire
People educated at George Watson's College
World Rugby Hall of Fame inductees
Scottish Claymores players
American football placekickers
Footballers who switched code
Scotland international rugby union players
Edinburgh District (rugby union) players
Alumni of the University of the West of Scotland
Scotland 'B' international rugby union players